The 2007 UEFA Intertoto Cup was the 19th and penultimate edition of the competition and took 50 entries. Three rounds were held, and 11 teams qualified for the second qualifying round of the UEFA Cup. The draw took place at UEFA headquarters in Nyon, Switzerland on 23 April 2007. The overall champion was Hamburg after they progressed further than the other Intertoto sides in the UEFA Cup.

First round
The first legs were held on 23 and 24 June 2007, while the second legs were held on 30 June and 1 July 2007.

|-
!colspan="5"|Southern-Mediterranean region
|-

|-
!colspan="5"|Central-East region
|-

|-
!colspan="5"|Northern region
|-

First leg

Second leg

Gloria Bistriţa won 3–2 on aggregate.

2–2 on aggregate, Vllaznia Shkodër won on away goals rule.

Makedonija Ğjorče Petrov won 2–1 on aggregate.

Maribor won 5–1 on aggregate.

Slavija Istočno Sarajevo won 6–4 on aggregate.

Tobol won 3–2 on aggregate.

Shakhtyor Soligorsk won 4–3 on aggregate.

2–2 on aggregate, Dacia Chișinău won on penalty kicks.

Slovan Bratislava won 5–0 on aggregate.

Cliftonville won 2–1 on aggregate.

Hammarby won 3–1 on aggregate.

Honka won 4–2 on aggregate.

Cork City won 2–1 on aggregate.

6–6 on aggregate, Vėtra advanced on away goals rule.

1 Following Scotland and Norway's withdrawals, the free places were awarded to Romania and Andorra.
2 This match was played at Stadion Pod Goricom in Podgorica because Grbalj's ground in Radanovići does not meet UEFA standards.
3 This match was played at Skopje City Stadium in Skopje because Makedonija Ğorče Petrov's ground in Skopje does not meet UEFA standards.
4 This match was played at Koševo Stadium in Sarajevo because Slavija's ground in Istočno Sarajevo does not meet UEFA standards.
5 This match was played at Linfield's Windsor Park in Belfast because Cliftonville's ground does not meet UEFA standards.
6 This match was played at Råsunda in Solna because Hammarby's ground does not meet UEFA standards.
7 This match was played at Richmond Park in Carmarthen because Llanelli's ground does not meet UEFA standards.

Second round
The first legs were held on 7 and 8 July 2007, while the second legs were held on 14 and 15 July 2007.

|-
!colspan="5"|Southern-Mediterranean region
|-

|-
!colspan="5"|Central-East region
|-

|-
!colspan="5"|Northern region
|-

First leg

FK Vėtra won 3–0 on aggregate.

Second leg

Oțelul Galați won 3–0 on aggregate.

Cherno More Varna won 7–0 on aggregate.

Hajduk Kula won 5–2 on aggregate.

Trabzonspor won 10–0 on aggregate.

2–2 on aggregate, Gloria Bistriţa won in penalty shootout.

1–1 on aggregate, Dacia Chișinău won in penalty shootout.

Rubin Kazan won 5–0 on aggregate.

Rapid Wien won 3–2 on aggregate.

Chornomorets Odessa won 6–2 on aggregate.

Tobol won 3–1 on aggregate.

3–3 on aggregate, AaB won on away goals rule.

Gent won 6–0 on aggregate.

Hammarby won 2–1 on aggregate.

1 This match was played at Koševo Stadium in Sarajevo because FK Slavija's ground in Istočno Sarajevo does not meet UEFA standards.
2 This match was played at Skopje City Stadium in Skopje because FK Makedonija's ground in Skopje does not meet UEFA standards.
3 This match was played at Naftex Stadium in Burgas because PFC Cherno More Varna's ground in Varna doesn't meet UEFA standards.
4 This match was played at Marakana in Belgrade because Hajduk's ground in Kula doesn't meet UEFA standards.
5 This match was played at Pohjola Stadion in Vantaa because Honka Espoo's ground in Espoo does not meet UEFA standards.
6 This match was awarded to Vėtra 3–0 after match was abandoned due to Legia fans invading the pitch at the first leg. UEFA has expelled Legia from Intertoto Cup 2007 and banned the club from one future European season should they qualify again within the next five years.

7 This match was played at Linfield F.C.'s Windsor Park in Belfast because Cliftonville F.C.'s ground does not meet UEFA standards.
8 This match was played at Råsunda in Solna because Hammarby's ground does not meet UEFA standards.

Third round
The first legs were held on 21 and 22 July 2007, while the second legs were held on 28 and 29 July 2007. The eleven winning teams qualified for the second qualifying round of UEFA Cup.

|-
!colspan="5"|Southern-Mediterranean region
|-

|-
!colspan="5"|Central-East region
|-

|-
!colspan="5"|Northern region
|-

First leg

Second leg

União Leiria won 4–2 on aggregate.

Sampdoria won 2–0 on aggregate.

2–2 on aggregate, Atlético Madrid won on away goals rule.

Oțelul Galați won 4–2 on aggregate.

Tobol Kostanay won 2–0 on aggregate.

Hamburg won 5–1 on aggregate.

Lens won 3–1 on aggregate.

Rapid Vienna won 3–1 on aggregate.

Blackburn Rovers won 6–0 on aggregate.

1–1 on aggregate, Hammarby won on away goals rule.

Aalborg BK won 3–2 on aggregate.

1 This match was played at Marakana in Belgrade because Hajduk's ground in Kula doesn't meet UEFA standards.
2 This match was played at Naftex Stadium in Burgas because Cherno More Varna's ground does not meet UEFA standards.

3 This match was played at Råsunda in Solna because Hammarby's ground does not meet UEFA standards.

Overall winners
Nine of the eleven co-winners which entered the UEFA Cup via the Intertoto won their qualifying ties and progressed to the first round proper. Only three of these nine sides survived the first round and entered the group stages, and of those, Hamburg and Atlético Madrid qualified for the knockout stages. Hamburg advanced to the round of 16 by defeating FC Zürich 3–1 on aggregate, while Atlético Madrid lost to Bolton Wanderers 1–0; leaving Hamburg as the only team remaining from this year's competition, being the overall champions of Intertoto Cup. Hamburg was eliminated in the round of 16.

  Hamburg (Overall winners) (round of 16, lost to Bayer Leverkusen)
  Atlético Madrid (round of 32, lost to Bolton Wanderers)
  Aalborg (Group stage, fourth in Group G)
  Sampdoria (First round, lost to Aalborg BK)
  Blackburn Rovers (First round, lost to Larissa)
  Lens (First round, lost to København)
  União Leiria (First round, lost to Bayer Leverkusen)
  Rapid Vienna (First round, lost to Anderlecht)
  Hammarby (First round, lost to Sporting Braga)
  Oțelul Galați (Second qualifying round, lost to Lokomotiv Sofia)
  Tobol Kostanay (Second qualifying round, lost to Dyskobolia Grodzisk)

Top goalscorers

See also
2007–08 UEFA Champions League
2007–08 UEFA Cup

Notes and references

External links
 Official UEFA site
 Uefa Regions
 UI cup official rules & regulations
 Match Detail at RSSSF.com

 

UEFA Intertoto Cup
3